Robert Raymond (Bob) Woodward  (5 June 1923 – 21 February 2010) was an Australian architect who gained widespread recognition for his innovative fountain designs.

Background and early career
Robert Raymond Woodward was born in Wentworthville in Sydney's western suburbs, the son of a public service accountant. Woodward was educated at Granville Technical Granville and Sydney Technical College. He served in the army during World War II working as an armourer. He was initially stationed with the Lachlan Macquarie 54th Regiment in Bathurst, then at Victoria Barracks where he completed an armoury course at East Sydney Technical College. Woodward later explained that being in the army at a young age had taught him to be responsible for the work he was doing and how to give instructions effectively. It also opened up the opportunity to study architecture at the University of Sydney after the war as part of the huge post-war repatriation intake of ex-servicemen.

Woodward commenced his architectural degree in 1947 and was impressed by teachers such as Leslie Wilkinson, George Molnar and Lloyd Rees. As a student he worked for Harry Divola and Peddle Thorp & Walker, while he represented Australia in the 440-yard hurdles at the 1950 British Empire Games in New Zealand. After graduating with honours in 1952 he joined the Royal Australian Institute of Architects and worked briefly for Peddle Thorp & Walker, detailing industrial buildings, but soon headed off for England. He toured Europe with friends from Sydney before settling in Finland where he was privileged to work for a year with Alvar Aalto. He also spent another year in Finland working for the firm of Viljo Revell. Upon his return he went into partnership, forming Woodward, Taranto and Wallace, specialising in commercial and industrial architecture.

Woodward considered that architectural education in Finland was impressive in the way that it demanded that its students actually build structures. He considered that "architects need to understand materials" and was impressed by 'Aalto's multi-disciplinary approach where landscape is involved in the building, and interior design, lighting, furnishings, fabrics... I think Aalto's main contribution, and this is to put it very simplistically ... was that he was able to get the best of Bauhaus as well as organic work... Aalto's principles, as stated by him, are that essentially everything in architecture is related to biology. If you take a leaf from a tree, for example, you can see... design principles which should apply to architecture itself. The first item is cellular structure which Aalto saw as the cells being spatial - not physical elements put together but spaces, and a leaf is made up of a whole multitude of similar cells. They mightn't be the same but they are similar and from one family. The way they are structured together is a flexible combination of those elements - cellular structure, flexible combination and the repetition...'

Woodward returned to Sydney in 1954 where he had some job offers from big firms, but instead formed a small partnership with Phil Taranto in Bankstown, they were later joined by Scott Wallace. They worked on small scale sites like a fruit shop in Bankstown, where they rationalized the work spaces, designed light fittings and introduced mirrored walls to increase the impression of light and plenty - innovations which were widely "copied and mass produced".

Landscape architecture
In 1959, Woodward submitted a design to a City of Sydney competition to construct a fountain in Kings Cross, mainly as a professional "design exercise" for himself. The design commemorated the war service of the 9th Division of the Second Australian Imperial Force. He won the competition in the name of his firm Woodward & Taranto and went on to build the El Alamein Fountain, as it became known, was completed in 1961. Combining his architectural and earlier metalwork training he developed the "dandelion" inspired fountain which became one of the world's most copied designs. The fountain won the New South Wales Institute of Architects Civic Design Award in 1964. This was an immediate success and led to the gradual reorientation of his career into national and international prominence as a fountain designer. In 1968 the Woodward Taranto Wallace partnership was dissolved and Woodward continued alone as a sole practitioner with a focus on fountain design, joining the Australian Institute of Landscape Architects in 1989. He is responsible for many of the most prominent and admired fountains in Australia.

In his oral history interview with Hazel de Berg in 1972, Woodward stated:

Woodward suggested that he didn't restrict himself to fountain design, as he explained to De Berg:

Due to the success of this fountain, Woodward was approached for further commissions for fountain designs, significantly altering his career path. In 1979, he created the Canberra Times fountain, commissioned for the newspaper's fiftieth anniversary. Following this, he was commissioned to design a fountain for the High Court of Australia Building in Canberra, a cascade beside the ceremonial ramp. In 1981, he completed a fountain for GJ Coles & Company for the Parliament Reserve in Melbourne.

The Darling Harbour Woodward Water Feature outside the Sydney Convention & Exhibition Centre completed in 1988 was one of Woodward's most important works. It was a beautiful piece of design with its interplay of water, light and surface texture. It is both an irresistibly interactive water element and beautiful spiral sculptural form.

Woodward was the recipient of many awards and honours in his lifetime, including the NSW Institute of Architect's Civic Design Award for the El Alamein Fountain in 1964, and in 1991 ACT Chapter RAIA Canberra Medallion, for New Parliament House, the 1991 NSW Chapter Civic Design Merit Award for Darling Harbour, the 1991 RAIA Walter Burley Griffin Award for Darling Harbour, the 1991 RAIA Civic Design Award for Darling Harbour, and the 1992 AILA National Awards in Landscape Architecture Civic Design Project Award.

In 1987 he was appointed a Member of Order of Australia for his services to architecture and fountain design.

Selected works by Robert Woodward
El Alamein Fountain, Kings Cross, Sydney 1959
St Paul's Church, Wentworthville, Sydney 1964
Alcoa Forecourt Fountain, San Francisco 1967
Archibald Memorial Fountain, Restoration of 1933 fountain, Hyde Park, Sydney 1968
Bank of California Fountain Portland, Oregon 1969
Geyser Room Restaurant, New Zealand Pavilion, Expo '70, Osaka 1970
Tupperware Forecourt Fountain Orlando, Florida 1970
Chifley Square Fountain Sydney 1971
Grace Memorial Fountain, Roselands Campsie, Sydney 1972
Berger Foundation Fountain, Minneapolis 1975
Wall of Water, Sydney Square, Town Hall, Sydney 1976
Blue Wave Ceramic Sculpture, Bondi Junction Plaza Sydney 1977
Mini El Alamein Fountain, Perak Turf Club, Ipoh, Malaysia 1978
Canberra Times Fountain, Canberra 1979
Forecourt Cascades, High Court of Australia Building, Canberra 1980
Five Islands Fountain donated by the Illawarra Mercury, Wollongong 1981
GJ Coles Fountain, Parliament Gardens, Melbourne 1981
Lane Cove Plaza proposal, Lane Cove, Sydney 1981
Mount Street Doughnuts North Sydney 1982
New South Wales Parliament House Courtyard Fountain Sydney 1983
Lyric Theatre Fountain, Queensland Performing Arts Centre, Brisbane 1984
Palmerston City Square Fountain Darwin 1985
Pacific Bell Forecourt Fountain, San Ramon, California 1988
Forecourt, Parliament House, Canberra 1988
Darling Harbour Water Feature outside the Sydney Convention & Exhibition Centre 1988
Modular Spiral Stair, precast Bankstown

Selected works

References

Bibliography

Attribution

External links
 Sculptors Society (Sydney) website, with photographs, architectural drawings, and 3 essays.

1923 births
2010 deaths
Members of the Order of Australia
20th-century Australian sculptors
Modernist architects
Australian landscape architects
Australian male hurdlers
Commonwealth Games competitors for Australia
Athletes (track and field) at the 1950 British Empire Games
Australian Army personnel of World War II